Canneto is a village in Tuscany, central Italy,  administratively a frazione of the comune of Monteverdi Marittimo, province of Pisa. At the time of the 2001 census its population was 182.

Canneto is about 90 km from Pisa and 5 km from Monteverdi Marittimo.

References 

Frazioni of the Province of Pisa